Robert Rankin Dunlap (July 25, 1915 – February 15, 1992) was an American lawyer and politician.

Dunlap was born in Saint Paul, Minnesota and graduated fron Saint Paul Central High School. He received his law degree from University of Minnesota Law School in 1941. Dunlap served in the United States Army during World War II. He lived in Plainview, Wabasha County, Minnesota with his wife and practiced law in Plainview, Minnesota. Dunlap served in the Minnesota Senate from 1953 to 1966 and was a Republican. He also served as the Wabasha County Attorney. In 1964, Dunlap moved to Rochester, Minnesota with his wife and family and continued to practice law. Dunlap died from a heart attack in Rochester, Minnesota.

References

1915 births
1992 deaths
University of Minnesota Law School alumni
Military personnel from Minnesota
Minnesota lawyers
Politicians from Rochester, Minnesota
Politicians from Saint Paul, Minnesota
People from Plainview, Minnesota
Republican Party Minnesota state senators